A complex question, trick question, multiple question, fallacy of presupposition, or  (Latin, 'of many questions')  is a question that has a presupposition that is complex. The presupposition is a proposition that is presumed to be acceptable to the respondent when the question is asked. The respondent becomes committed to this proposition when they give any direct answer. When a presupposition includes an admission of wrongdoing, it is called a "loaded question" and is a form of entrapment in legal trials or debates. The presupposition is called "complex" if it is a conjunctive proposition, a disjunctive proposition, or a conditional proposition. It could also be another type of proposition that contains some logical connective in a way that makes it have several parts that are component propositions.

Complex questions can but do not have to be fallacious, as in being an informal fallacy.

Complex question fallacy

The complex question fallacy, or many questions fallacy, is context dependent; a presupposition by itself doesn't have to be a fallacy. It is committed when someone asks a question that presupposes something that has not been proven or accepted by all the people involved. For example, "Is Mary wearing a blue or a red dress?" is fallacious because it artificially restricts the possible responses to a blue or red dress, when in fact Mary might be wearing a different coloured dress, or trousers, or a skirt. If the person being questioned wouldn't necessarily consent to those constraints, the question is fallacious.

Hence we can distinguish between:
 legitimately complex question (not a fallacy): A question that assumes something that the hearer would readily agree to.  For example, "Who is the monarch of the United Kingdom?" assumes that there is a place called the United Kingdom and that it has a monarch, both true.
 illegitimately complex question:  "Who is the King of France?" would commit the complex question fallacy because while it assumes there is a place called France (true), it also assumes France currently has a king (false).  But since answering this question does not seem to incriminate or otherwise embarrass the speaker, it is complex but not really a loaded question.

When a complex question contains controversial presuppositions (often with loaded language—having an unspoken and often emotive implication), it is known as a loaded question. For example, a classic loaded question, containing incriminating assumptions that the questioned persons seem to admit to if they answer the questions instead of challenging them, is "Have you stopped beating your wife?" If the person questioned answers "yes", that implies that they have previously beaten their wife. A loaded question may be asked to trick the respondent into admitting something that the questioner believes to be true, and which may in fact be true.  So the previous question is "loaded", whether or not the respondent has actually beaten their wife–and if the respondent answers anything other than "yes" or "no" in an attempt to deny having beaten their wife, the questioner can accuse him of "trying to dodge the question".  The very same question may be loaded in one context, but not in the other. For example, the previous question would not be loaded were it asked during a trial in which the defendant has already admitted having beaten one's wife.

Similar questions and fallacies
A similar fallacy is the double-barreled question. It is committed when someone asks a question that touches upon more than one issue, yet allows only for one answer.

See also
 Wicked problem

Notes

External links
http://philosophy.lander.edu/logic/complex.html

Verbal fallacies